Chris Gifford may refer to:

 Chris Gifford (field hockey) (born 1966), former field hockey striker from Canada
 Chris Gifford (writer), writer and executive producer at Nickelodeon